In the context of the conservation of endangered species in Japan, and the list below,  are those designated by Cabinet order in accordance with the 1992 Act on Conservation of Endangered Species of Wild Fauna and Flora.

Definitions and provisions
 The conservation status of species, subspecies, and varieties of wild fauna and flora are to be monitored by the nation, which together with local public entities, is to formulate and implement measures for the conservation of endangered species, assisted by the contribution and cooperation of the public (Article 2)
 National Endangered Species, as designated by Cabinet order, are those that live or grow in Japan (Article 4)
 International Endangered Species, as designated by Cabinet order, and excluding National Endangered Species, are those for which arrangements have been made, aimed at their conservation, through international cooperation (Article 4)
 Temporarily Designated Endangered Species, with an Urgent Endangered Species Designation, are those, without protection as NES and IES, so designated, for a period of no more than three years, by the Minister of the Environment (Article 5)
 Designated Nationally Endangered Species, as designated by Cabinet order, are those that may be commercially bred or propagated and are not subject to arrangements, aimed at their conservation, through international cooperation (Article 4)
 No organism from a NES or Temporarily Designated Endangered Species may be captured, collected, killed, or harmed without a permit, specified commercial purpose, or other specified unavoidable grounds (Article 9–19)
 Those with legitimate title to organisms or body parts of IES shall arrange registration (Article 20–29)
 Where the Minister of the Environment deems it necessary for conservation of a NES, a Natural Habitat Protection Area may be designated, involving specification of the area (including managed, restricted, and monitoring zones), the NES, and related guidelines (Article 36–44)
 Programs for the rehabilitation of natural habitats and the maintenance of viable populations may be required (Article 45–48)

National Endangered Species
As of 4 January 2021, 395 NES have been designated.

Birds
45 NES:
 Aleutian cackling goose, Branta hutchinsii leucopareia
 Tufted puffin, Fratercula cirrhata
 Uria aalge inornata
 Spoon-billed sandpiper, Eurynorhynchus pygmeus
 Amami woodcock, Scolopax mira
 Spotted greenshank, Tringa guttifer
 Oriental stork, Ciconia boyciana
 Crested ibis, Nipponia nippon
 Black-faced spoonbill, Platalea minor
 Chalcophaps indica yamashinai
 Columba janthina nitens
 Columba janthina stejnegeri
 Aquila chrysaetos japonica
 Buteo buteo toyoshimai
 Circus spilonotus spilonotus
 Haliaeetus albicilla albicilla
 Steller's sea eagle, Haliaeetus pelagicus
 Nisaetus nipalensis orientalis
 Spilornis cheela perplexus
 Falco peregrinus japonensis
 
 Red-crowned crane, Grus japonensis
 Emberiza aureola ornata
 Swinhoe's rail, Coturnicops exquisitus
 Okinawa rail, Gallirallus okinawae
 Chloris sinica kittlitzi
 Apalopteron familiare hahasima
 Lanius cristatus superciliosus
 Locustella pryeri pryeri
 Luscinia komadori komadori
 Luscinia komadori namiyei
 Izu thrush, Turdus celaenops
 Zoothera dauma major
 Fairy pitta, Pitta nympha
 Phalacrocorax urile, Phalacrocorax urile
 Schrenck's bittern, Ixobrychus eurhythmus
 Dendrocopos leucotos owstoni
 Picoides tridactylus inouyei
 Okinawa woodpecker, Sapheopipo noguchii
 Short-tailed albatross, Phoebastria albatrus
 Band-rumped storm petrel, Oceanodroma castro
 Bryan's shearwater, Puffinus bryani
 Puffinus lherminieri bannermani
 Bubo bubo borissowi
 Ketupa blakistoni blakistoni

Mammals
15 NES:
 Tsushima leopard cat [ja], Prionailurus bengalensis euptilurus
 Iriomote cat, Prionailurus bengalensis iriomotensis
 Daito flying fox, Pteropus dasymallus daitoensis
 Erabu flying fox, Pteropus dasymallus dasymallus
 Bonin flying fox, Pteropus pselaphon
 Orii's least horseshoe bat, Rhinolophus cornutus orii
 , Rhinolophus pumilus pumilus
 Southeast Asian long-fingered bat, Miniopterus fuscus
 Ryukyu tube-nosed bat, Murina ryukyuana
 Yanbaru whiskered bat, Myotis yanbarensis
 Amami rabbit, Pentalagus furnessi
 Muennink's spiny rat, Tokudaia muenninki
 Ryukyu spiny rat, Tokudaia osimensis
 Tokunoshima spiny rat, Tokudaia tokunoshimensis
 Ryukyu long-tailed giant rat, Diplothrix legata

Reptiles
11 NES:
 Okinawa ground gecko, Goniurosaurus kuroiwae kuroiwae
 Spotted ground gecko, Goniurosaurus kuroiwae orientalis
 Sengoku ground gecko, Goniurosaurus kuroiwae sengokui
 Toyama's ground gecko, Goniurosaurus kuroiwae toyamai
 Yamashina's ground gecko, Goniurosaurus kuroiwae yamashinae
 Banded ground gecko, Goniurosaurus splendens
 Sakishima grass lizard, Takydromus dorsalis
 Miyako grass lizard, Takydromus toyamai
 , Hebius concelarus
 Kikuzato's brook snake, Opisthotropis kikuzatoi
 Ryukyu black-breasted leaf turtle, Geoemyda japonica

Amphibians
14 NES:
 Holst's frog, Babina holsti
 Otton frog, Babina subaspera
 Namie's frog, Limnonectes namiyei
 Ishikawa's frog, Odorrana ishikawae
 , Odorrana splendida
 Utsunomiya's tip-nosed frog, Odorrana utsunomiyaorum
 Abe's salamander, Hynobius abei
 , Hynobius amakusaensis
 , Hynobius osumiensis
 , Hynobius shinichisatoi
 Tokyo salamander, Hynobius tokyoensis
 Tosashimizu salamander, Hynobius tosashimizuensis
 , Onychodactylus tsukubaensis
 Anderson's crocodile newt, Echinotriton andersoni

Fish
10 NES:
 Cobitis striata hakataensis
 Cobitis takenoi
 Ayumodoki, Parabotia curtus
 Deepbody bitterling, Acheilognathus longipinnis
 Acheilognathus tabira nakamurae
 Hemigrammocypris neglectus
 Rhodeus atremius suigensis
 Tokyo bitterling, Tanakia tanago
 Gymnogobius nakamurae
 Ariakehimeshirauo, Neosalanx reganius

Insects
52 NES:
 Tamamushia virida virida

Molluscs
48 NES

Crustaceans
6 NES:
 
 Paraleptuca boninensis

Vascular plants
194 NES (including 63 Designated Nationally Endangered Species that are commercially propagated):
 
 Rhododendron boninense
 Vaccinium amamianum
 
 Deutzia yaeyamensis

International Endangered Species
As of 1 July 2021, 217 birds have been designated IES in accordance with international migratory bird agreements, with other IES corresponding to those listed in the CITES Appendices.

Temporarily Designated Endangered Species
As of  1 July 2021, three species are subject to Urgent Endangered Species Designation (until 30 June 2024):
 Scolopendra alcyona
 Eucorydia donanensis
 Eucorydia miyakoensis

See also
 Japanese Red List
 Wildlife Protection Areas in Japan
 Protected Forests (Japan)
 Protected Water Surfaces (Japan)

References

External links
  Nature Conservation in Japan: Wildlife Protection (Ministry of the Environment)
  List of National Endangered Species (Ministry of the Environment)

Nature conservation in Japan